Richard Gibson (13 July 1866 – 28 October 1943) was an Australian rules footballer who played with Hotham/North Melbourne and South Melbourne, and later an umpire in the Victorian Football League (VFL).

Family
The son of George Thomas Gibson (1828–1879), and Margaret Gibson (1837–1882), née Slaven, Richard Gibson was born at Williamstown, Victoria on 13 July 1866.

He married Abigail Mary Snow (1868–1936) on 23 July 1890.

Footballer
After playing for North Melbourne and South Melbourne in the VFA, Dick "Hockey" Gibson was a member of the inaugural South Melbourne VFL team in 1897 and vice-captained the club in his two VFL seasons.

Umpire
He became the first VFL player to umpire a Grand Final in 1903 when he was the field umpire for the 1903 VFL Grand Final. In all he officiated in 98 VFL matches as a field umpire and also appeared as a boundary umpire three times.

Death
He died at his home in Ascot Vale, Victoria on 28 October 1943.

See also
 1908 Melbourne Carnival

Notes

References
Holmesby, Russell and Main, Jim (2007). The Encyclopedia of AFL Footballers. 7th ed. Melbourne: Bas Publishing.

External links
 
 Dick Gibson's umpiring statistics from AFL Tables
 

1866 births
1943 deaths
Australian Rules footballers: place kick exponents
Sydney Swans players
Australian Football League umpires
Australian rules footballers from Melbourne
People from Williamstown, Victoria